Scotts Creek is a tributary of the Delaware River contained wholly within Falls Township, Bucks County, Pennsylvania, and drains at the Delaware's 124.10 river mile.

History
On a map by Lindeström in 1654-1656, Scotts Creek was known as Sepaessing Kijl. Sepaessing was a Native American word meaning 'plum tree' and the term Kijl was a Swedish term meaning river or creek. Because of the excavations of the Warner Company, Scotts Creek retains little of its original characteristics. Most of it is contained within Manor Lake and Van Sciver Lake.

Statistics
Scotts Creek was entered into the Geographic Names Information System of the U.S. Geological Survey on 2 August 1979 as identification number 1187173, U.S. Department of the Interior Geological Survey I.D. is 02926.

Course
The current source of Scotts Creek is Van Sciver Lake, flowing south through Manor Lake on to the Delaware River's 124.10 river mile.

Municipalities
Falls Township

Crossings and Bridges
Pennsbury Memorial Road
Bordentown Road
Tyburn Road

See also
List of rivers of Pennsylvania
List of rivers of the United States
List of Delaware River tributaries

References

Rivers of Bucks County, Pennsylvania
Rivers of Pennsylvania
Tributaries of the Delaware River